The 1968 FA Charity Shield was a football match played on 3 August 1968 between Football League champions Manchester City and FA Cup winners West Bromwich Albion. It was the 46th Charity Shield match and was played at City's home ground, Maine Road. Manchester City won 6–1.

The official match programme cost one shilling.

Match details

See also
1967–68 Football League
1967–68 FA Cup

References

1968
Charity Shield 1968
Charity Shield 1968
Comm
Charity Shield